Paul Meilhat (born 17 May 1982) is a French sailor and navigator. He was a high level 49er dinghy sailor with Olympic aspirations before moving into offshore sailing. From 2015 to the end of 2018 he was skipper of the IMOCA 60 - SMA and he competed in the Vendee Globe.

Rankings
2019:
 7th - Transat Jaque Vabre on Initiatives cœur with Sam Davies
 7th - Défi Azimut
 5th - Rolex Fastnet Race
2018:
 winner of the Route du Rhum - Destination Guadeloupe in the IMOCA category on SMA in 12 days, 11 hours, 23 minutes and 18 seconds; 6th overal 
 winner of the Monaco Globes series, doubles with Gwénolé Gahinet
 winner of the Bermuda 1000 Race - Douarnenez Cascais
2017:
 winner of the Rolex Fastnet Race, doubles with Gwénolé Gahinet on IMOCA SMA
 2nd in the Transat Jacques Vabre, doubles with Gwénolé Gahinet on IMOCA SMA
 RET for the 2016-2017 Vendee Globe with keel issues
2016:
 4th in the Transat New York-Vendée.
2015:
 winner of the SNSM record, doubles with Michel Desjoyeaux, in 37 hours, 4 minutes and 23 seconds
2014:
 1st - Transat AG2R with Gwénolé Gahinet on "Safran Guy Cotten"
2012:
 4th - Transat AG2R with Fabien Delahaye on "Macif"
2007
 31st - ISAF Sailing World Championships Cascais, POR
2006
 34th - 49er World Championship - Aix Les Bains, FRA
2005
 29th - 49er World Championship, Moscow, RUS
2004
 68th - 49er World Championship (Olympic Qualifier), Athens, GRE

References

External links
 
 
 

1982 births
Living people
French male sailors (sport)
Figaro class sailors
IMOCA 60 class sailors
French Vendee Globe sailors
2016 Vendee Globe sailors